The New York University Annual Survey of American Law (Annual Survey) is a student-run law journal at New York University School of Law.

Mission 
The Annual Survey of American Law was founded in 1942, making it the second-oldest law journal at NYU. The journal formally added New York University to the title in 1999. Originally, it was compiled by members of the NYU faculty as a comprehensive annual reference to developments in American law.  The Annual Survey is now a quarterly publication that, in addition to publishing generalist legal scholarship, continues to dedicate itself to exploring legal developments from a practice-oriented perspective.

Scholarship 
The Annual Survey publishes four issues each year.  Two are general issues containing legal scholarship on current issues in American law.  The Annual Survey each year sponsors a symposium, bringing scholars, advocates, and members of the judiciary to NYU to discuss a topic of interest, and publishes a symposium issue of the journal with articles arising out of the symposium.  A dedication is held each year to honor an important figure in the legal community at which scholars and peers honor that figure.  This event leads to a dedication issue focused on the life and work of that author. The journal also fosters student scholarship through a note-writing program, and frequently publishes the work of NYU students.

Selection  
Each year the Annual Survey selects 50 new Staff Editors from the rising 2L class on the basis of writing competition entries, bluebooking, grades, resumes, and personal statements.

Writing program and competition 
Soon after selection to the Annual Survey, rising 2L Staff Editors are invited to participate in a special competition for the journal's Note Writing program.  The writing program allows 2L Staff Editors to focus exclusively on the development of a student note for publication in the Annual Survey: program participants agree to a rigorous writing schedule but are afforded an exemption from most journal production assignments.

Notable alumni 
Raymond Lohier, Judge of the United States Court of Appeals for the Second Circuit

References

External links  
 NYU Annual Survey
 NYU School of Law

Law journals edited by students
American law journals
New York University School of Law
Publications established in 1942
1942 establishments in New York City
General law journals
English-language journals